Message to the Young is the eighth album by blues musician Howlin' Wolf released by Chess Records in 1971.

Reception

Cash McCall stated "I did an album on Howlin’ Wolf that didn't work out too well, I didn't know the man couldn't read and that was Message To The Young. I produced that and Wolf didn't have any respect for me, as I was so young".

Track listing 
All compositions by Sarah Lewis and Sonny Thompson except where noted
 "If I Were a Bird" (Morris Dollison) – 4:34
 "I Smell a Rat" – 2:15
 "Miss James" – 3:27
 "Message to the Young" (Thompson, Ralph Bass) – 5:50
 "She's Looking Good" (Roger Collins) – 2:40
 "Just As Long" – 3:42
 "Romance Without Finance" – 3:22
 "Turn Me On" – 4:32

Personnel 
Howlin' Wolf – vocals, harmonica
Sonny Thompson – piano, arranger, conductor
John Jeremiah – organ
Bryce Roberson, Jon Stocklin – guitar
Bob Crowder – bass
Tyrone Smith – drums
Cash McCall – arranger, conductor
Unidentified horn section and vocalists

References 

1971 albums
Howlin' Wolf albums
Chess Records albums